The unification of the Georgian realm was the 10th-century political movement that resulted in the consolidation of various Georgian Crowns into a single realm with centralized government in 1008, the Kingdom of Georgia, or Sakartvelo. Originally initiated by the powerful local aristocracy of the eristavs, due to centuries-long power struggles and aggressive wars of succession between the Georgian monarchs, arising from their independent ruling traditions of classical antiquity and its Hellenistic-era monarchical establishments in Colchis and Iberia. The initiative was supported by David III the Great of the Bagrationi dynasty, the most powerful ruler in the Caucasus at the time, who would put prince royal Bagrat, his kin and foster-son, on Iberian throne, who would eventually be crowned as a King of all-Georgia. David's Bagratid successors would become the champions of national unification, just like the Rurikids or the Capetians, but despite their enthusiasm, some of the Georgian polities that had been targeted for unification did not join the unification freely and would actively fight against it throughout this process, mostly seeking help and support from the Byzantine Empire and the Abbasid Caliphate. Even though, 1008 unification of the realm would unite most of western and central Georgian lands, the process will continue to the east, and eventually, would reach its total completion under King David IV the Builder. This unprecedented political unification of lands and the meteoric rise of Bagrationi power would inaugurate the Georgian Golden Age and creation of the only medieval pan-Caucasian empire attaining its greatest geographical extent, that would dominate entire Caucasus in the 11th, 12th, and 13th centuries. The centralizing power of the crown started to weaken in the 14th century, and even though the tide turned back under King George V the Brilliant, the reunification came up to be short-lived; unified realm would evaporate after invasions of Mongols and Timur that would result in its total collapse in the 15th century.

Background
The Sasanian Empire abolished the Georgian monarchy and annexed the Kingdom of Iberia in 580, making it a Sasanian province ruled by the Persian marzbans and later, demoted in rank, by native Iberian princes. In the 8th century Arabs would invade Georgian lands and establish Emirate of Tbilisi, while Georgian dynastic princes would flee to Uplistsikhe and Kakheti. In 888, Adarnase IV would restore the Georgian kingship in the name of the Kingdom of the Iberians, a monarchy that was concentrated on the historical lands of Tao and Klarjeti. The Kingdom of the Abkhazians would be experiencing the dynastic succession crisis, while warmongering and emerging east Georgian power of Principality of Kakheti would be in constant conflict with the Iberian neighbors. At the same time, the Georgian Orthodoxy was expanding and reaching the most eastern regions by 950, when Queen Dinar of Hereti renounced monophysitism, thus making all Georgian polities unified ecclesiastically, making political union inevitable. This was the very time when the concept and a compelling definition of Georgia was introduced by the writer and ecclesiastical lawyer Giorgi Merchule in 951 in his "Vita of Gregory of Khandzta".

Giorgi Merchule advanced the definition of the nation based upon religious and linguistic considerations. This trend would also continue under Georgian Sabaite monk John Zosimus who would attribute divine, unique and sacred role to the Georgian language, that, as he believed, would be a tongue to be used on the Last Judgment. The Georgian liturgical language was a national unifier when political and cultural unity was still very elusive. Eventually, with an immense ideological support from the clerics, the Georgian unification would come from a resurgent Bagrationi family based in the Kingdom of the Iberians and King George II of Abkhazia, and his policy of unifying Georgian polities by interdynastic marriages and intrigues, resulting, his daughter, princess Gurandukht marrying Gurgen, King of Kings of the Iberians, bearing Bagrat, the first all-Georgian king.

Initiative and David III

Georgian monarchies continued being torn apart by their local rulers and rival states. Right after yet another attack by the Principality of Kakheti on Iberian citadel of Uplistsikhe, part of the aristocracy led by one the most powerful and instrumental Georgian feudal lords, the eristavi, Ivane Marushisdze, who envisaged a unified Georgia with centralized monarchy, addressed and urged childless David III to end the chaos by taking control of all central Georgian lands and its core region of Kartli and to put his kin, prince Bagrat on throne, thus laying future foundation for a unification process of various lands into a single crown. If David III were to designate Bagrat his heir, Marushisdze reasoned, the extensive realm of David would be merged with lands of Bagrat, thus creating a formidable all-Georgian enterprise.

The bet of aristocracy on David III was no surprise as he was the major power in Caucasian and Byzantine commonwealth. David rose from an obscure non-royal branch of the Bagrationi family to glory thanks to his military valor and skills. David's armies would rescue the Byzantine emperor Basil II the Bulgar Slayer and the empire's Anatolian possessions from the rebel Bardas Skleros. David, with another Georgian, the hiero-strategos ("monk-warrior") John Tornike would lead 12,000 Georgian cavalrymen with Byzantine and Armenian soldiers at the Battle of Pankaleia defeating the emperor's rebels. Basil II would later reward David with a life-long, if not hereditary, grant of the vast lands in the south-eastern Anatolia. His unique position was the perfect pretext for the Georgian aristocracy to push David for unification. David accepted the aristocratic call. In 975 David adopted prince Bagrat and invaded Kartli. David took young Bagrat, his biological parents Gurgen and Gurandukht, to Uplistsikhe, then besieged by Kakhetian forces. The Kakhetians realized that all western and southern Georgia had now united against them. They had to accept David’s presentation of Bagrat as his "heir".

David acted decisively to ensure Bagrat also inherited the Abkhazian throne. By his mother Gurandukht, young Bagrat was nephew and heir to the blind and childless king Theodosius III of Abkhazia. A little later that same year, in 975, three years prior Theodosius III even died, David invited King Smbat II of Armenia to accompany him, Bagrat and Gurandukht to Kutaisi, where Bagrat was solemnly anointed king of Abkhazia, as Bagrat II.

Unified realm

David III was ruthless and followed aggressive expansion of his realm. The conspirators poisoned his communion wine on the eve of Good Friday, in 1000 or 1001. Whoever hired the murderers, emperor Basil II, or even resentful Georgian nobles, the legacy of David's unification process in the history of Georgian statehood was enormous. Prince Bagrat was made King of Abkhazia officially in 978. When his father, Gurgen, died in 1008, Bagrat’s claim to the Abkhazian and Iberian thrones, was undisputed. He became the first ruler of all-Georgian monarchy, as King Bagrat III, and officially styled as the "King of the Abkhazians and Iberians". It was only a matter of time before monarchies of Kakheti and Hereti also submitted to his unified Georgian realm, while the emirate of Tbilisi lingered on.

Bagrat III, being precociously far-sighted and ruthless, would continue the expansion of his unified realm and the suppression of the rebellious separatist aristocracy, including purging his own cousins so no rival Bagrationi could ever claim the Georgian throne.

See also
Style of the Georgian sovereign
Collapse of the Georgian realm

Notes

References

Bibliography 
Rapp, S. H. Jr. (2016) The Sasanian World Through Georgian Eyes, Caucasia and the Iranian Commonwealth in Late Antique Georgian Literature, Sam Houston State University, USA, Routledge, 
Rapp, S. H. Jr. & Crego, P. (2018) Languages and Cultures of Eastern Christianity: Georgian, Taylor & Francis, 
Rapp, S. H. Jr. (2003) Studies in Medieval Georgian Historiography: Early Texts and Eurasian Contexts,  Peeters Publishers, 
Rapp, S. H. Jr. (2017) Georgia before the Mongols, Oxford Research Encyclopedias: Asian History, Oxford University Press, David Ludden ed. Published OUP Online
Rayfield, D. (2013) Edge of Empires: A History of Georgia, Reaktion Books, 
Suny, R. G. (1994) The making of the Georgian nation, Indiana University Press, 
The Georgian Chronicles, Life of the Georgian kings, royal annals
Eastmond, A. (1998) Royal imagery in medieval Georgia, Pennsylvania State University, 
Bagrationi dynasty
11th century in the Kingdom of Georgia
National revivals
National unifications
10th century in Georgia (country)
11th century in Georgia (country)
1008 establishments in Europe